The Greater London Council (GLC) was the top-tier local government administrative body for Greater London from 1965 to 1986. It replaced the earlier London County Council (LCC) which had covered a much smaller area. The GLC was dissolved in 1986 by the Local Government Act 1985 and its powers were devolved to the London boroughs and other entities. A new administrative body, known as the Greater London Authority (GLA), was established in 2000.

Creation
The GLC was established by the London Government Act 1963, which sought to create a new body covering more of London rather than just the inner part of the conurbation, additionally including and empowering newly created London boroughs within the overall administrative structure.

In 1957 a Royal Commission on Local Government in Greater London had been set up under Sir Edwin Herbert, and this reported in 1960, recommending the creation of 52 new London boroughs as the basis for local government. It further recommended that the LCC be replaced by a weaker strategic authority, with responsibility for public transport, road schemes, housing development and regeneration. The Greater London Group, a research centre of academics within the London School of Economics, also had a significant effort on the commission's report and the eventual creation of the GLC. The elections for the new Greater London Council took place on April 9, 1964, and at that point the old London County Council passed into history.

Most of the commission's recommendations were accepted, but the number of new boroughs was reduced to 32. Greater London covered the whole County of London and most of Middlesex, plus parts of Essex, Kent, and Surrey, a small part of Hertfordshire and the County Boroughs of Croydon (Surrey) and East and West Ham (both in Essex), all of which had been independent of county council control since 1889.

Some areas on the boundaries of the area recommended by the Herbert Commission, fearing increased local taxation, fought successfully not to come under the new Greater London Council, notably the urban districts of Chigwell in Essex; and Sunbury-on-Thames, Staines and Potters Bar in Middlesex. Other areas recommended for inclusion that were never part of Greater London included Epsom and Ewell, Caterham and Warlingham, Esher, and Weybridge.

GLC councillors elected for areas within the former County of London became ex officio members of the new Inner London Education Authority, which took over the LCC responsibility for education. By contrast in Outer London, which was the rest of Greater London, the various London boroughs each became a local education authority, akin to a county council or county borough in the rest of England.

Powers
The GLC was responsible for running strategic services such as the fire service, emergency planning, waste disposal and flood prevention. The GLC shared responsibility with the London boroughs for providing roads, housing, city planning and leisure services. It had a very limited role in direct service provision with most functions the responsibility of the London boroughs. The GLC did not take control of public transport from the London Transport Board until 1970 and lost control to London Regional Transport in 1984.
Under the 1963 Act, the GLC was required to produce a Greater London Development Plan. The plan included in its wide-ranging remit: population changes, employment, housing, pollution, transport, roads, the central area, growth and development areas, urban open spaces and the urban landscape, public services and utilities and planning standards. The plan included the comprehensive redevelopment of Covent Garden and creating a central London motorway loop. The plan was subject to an Inquiry which lasted from July 1970 until May 1972. The campaign to save Covent Garden along with various opposition on other matters largely derailed the plan.

Composition and political control

Each of the six GLC elections was won by the leading national opposition party, with the party in government nationally coming second in the GLC elections.

The first GLC election was on 9 April 1964. Each of the new boroughs elected a number of representatives under the bloc vote system. Despite Conservative hopes, the first GLC consisted of 64 Labour and 36 Conservative councillors and Labour Group leader Bill Fiske became the first Leader of the council.

At the next election in 1967 the unpopularity of the national Labour government produced a massive Conservative victory with 82 seats, to Labour's 18. Desmond Plummer became the first Conservative leader of London-wide government in 33 years. The Conservatives retained control in 1970 with a reduced majority.

In 1972 the electoral system was reformed to introduce single-member constituencies for the election after the 1973 contest, and extend the term of office to four years. Labour fought the 1973 election on a strongly socialist platform and won with 57 seats to 33 for the Conservatives. The Liberals won two seats.

The GLC's hopes under the Labour administration of Reg Goodwin were badly affected by the oil crisis of 1974. Massive inflation, combined with the GLC's £1.6 billion debt, led to heavy rate increases (200% in total before the next election in 1977) and unpopular budget cuts. Some months before the 1977 elections the Labour Group began to split. A left group, including Ken Livingstone, denounced the election manifesto of the party.

The Conservatives regained control in May 1977, winning 64 seats under their new Thatcherite leader Horace Cutler against a Labour total of just 28. Cutler headed a resolutely right-wing administration, cutting spending, selling council housing and deprioritising London Transport. In opposition the Labour Party continued to fractionalise: Goodwin resigned suddenly in 1980 and in the following leadership contest the little-regarded left-winger Ken Livingstone was only just beaten in an intensely tactical campaign by the moderate Andrew McIntosh. However, the Labour left were strong at constituency level and as the 1981 election approached they worked to ensure that their members were selected to stand and that their democratic socialist anti-austerity convictions shaped the manifesto.

The May 1981 election was presented as a clash of ideologies by the Conservatives – Thatcherism against a "tax high, spend high" Marxist Labour group, claiming that Andrew McIntosh would be deposed by Ken Livingstone after the election. McIntosh and Labour Party leader Michael Foot insisted this was untrue, and Labour won a very narrow victory with a majority of six. At a pre-arranged meeting of the new Councillors the day after the election, the Left faction won a complete victory over the less-organised Labour right. McIntosh lost with 20 votes to 30 for Ken Livingstone. Livingstone, dubbed "Red Ken" by some newspapers, managed to gain the guarded support of the Labour deputy leader Illtyd Harrington and the party Chief Whip and set about his new administration. Livingstone's deputy leader of the GLC from 1985 to 1986 was John McDonnell, future Shadow Chancellor of the Exchequer under Jeremy Corbyn. Livingstone's Technology Director was Mike Cooley who established The Greater London Enterprise Board (GLEB).

Elections to the GLC
The results were as follows:

Notable schemes

The most notable and successful scheme of the GLC was the construction of the Thames Barrier that took place between 1974 and 1982 at a cost of £534 million. Some saw it as a GLC vanity project but over time people's opinions have changed: the barrier was used 35 times in the 1990s and was raised 75 times in the first decade of the 21st century, due to rising sea-levels.

In 1969, the GLC announced its plans for the London Ringways which were three motorways that were proposed to solve London's traffic problem once and for all. However, the scheme met with heavy opposition as it would have included the demolition of 30,000 homes. The Westway road scheme was opened in 1970 and hailed as a vision of the future. A review into the planned Ringways took place between 1970 and 1972. It concluded that construction should begin on the controversial Ringway One to relieve congestion in central London, but that the others needed a re-think. The Outer Ringway was given the go-ahead in 1973 and opened in 1986 as the M25 motorway. The remainder of the GLC's Ringway plans were finally killed off in the 1980s due to public opposition. This meant that the capital was left on a much more human scale than it might have been, but also meant that London was left with an eternally unsolved traffic problem.

In 1983, GLC considered investing £230,000 into Lucas rail-bus, which could run on roads and rail tracks. The original concept was developed by Lucas Aerospace workers in the 1970s. In 1980–1981, the workers' combine built a prototype out of a second-hand Bristol bus. The enthusiasm arose from the opportunity to cut costs on rail vehicle production by partially integrating bus parts. Two challenges had to be solved — collision consequences with much heavier rail vehicles and supervision of the transition from road to rail.

After World War II large areas of homes in London remained derelict after being bombed in the war and some housing that remained standing was often squalid and overcrowded. The GLC, with new housing powers, sought to resolve this but the results were mixed: efforts to relocate Londoners from the dilapidated inner-city areas to the suburbs or satellite towns were met with resistance from the residents of those areas.

In addition to the Thames Barrier, other notable successful GLC transport schemes which changed London included the Blackwall Tunnel and the Woolwich Ferry.

Abolition
Ken Livingstone's high-spend socialist policies put the GLC into direct conflict with Margaret Thatcher’s Conservative government. Livingstone soon became a thorn in the side of the sitting Conservative government. He antagonised Thatcher through a series of actions: these included posting a billboard of London's rising unemployment figures on the side of County Hall (directly opposite Parliament), as well as the Fares Fair policy of reducing Tube and bus fares using government subsidies, and meeting Sinn Féin MP Gerry Adams at a time when Adams was banned from entering Great Britain due to his links with the Provisional IRA.

By 1983, the government argued for the abolition of the GLC, claiming that it was inefficient and unnecessary, and that its functions could be carried out more efficiently by the boroughs. The arguments for this case which were detailed in the White Paper Streamlining the cities. Critics of this position argued that the GLC's abolition (as with that of the metropolitan county councils) was politically motivated, claiming that it had become a powerful vehicle for opposition to Margaret Thatcher's government. Livingstone and three other Labour councillors resigned in protest, and won back their seats easily in the September 1984 by-elections because the Conservatives refused to stand.

The Local Government Act 1985, which abolished the GLC, faced considerable opposition from many quarters but was narrowly passed in Parliament, setting the end of the council for 31 March 1986. It also cancelled the scheduled May 1985 elections. GLC assets were assigned to the London Residuary Body for disposal, including County Hall, which was sold to a Japanese entertainment company and now houses the London Aquarium and the London Dungeon, amongst other things.

The Inner London Education Authority (ILEA) continued in existence for a few years, and direct elections to it were held, but ILEA was finally also disbanded in 1990, with the Inner London boroughs assuming control over education as the outer boroughs had done on their creation in 1965.

Replacement

Most of the powers of the GLC were devolved to the London boroughs. Some powers, such as the fire service, were taken over by joint boards made up of councillors appointed by the boroughs – see waste authorities in Greater London for an example. In total, around 100 organisations were responsible for service delivery in Greater London.

Tony Blair's Labour government was elected in 1997, and was committed to bringing back London-wide government. In 1998 a referendum was held on the establishment of a new London authority and elected mayor, which was approved by a two to one margin.

The new Greater London Authority (GLA) was established in 2000 and was effectively a scaled down version of the GLC. The GLA has a very different structure to the GLC, consisting of a directly elected Mayor of London and a London Assembly. The Mayor of London elections were won by the same Ken Livingstone, who began his victory speech with the words: "As I was saying before I was so rudely interrupted 14 years ago ...".

In February 2020, Labour's Tom Copley, supported by the Conservative's Tony Arbour, both members of the London Assembly, called for the GLC's coat of arms to be adopted by the GLA but this has not materialised. Since the abolition of the GLC in 1986 the London Fire Brigade has continued to use the GLC coat of arms.

The archives of the Greater London Council are held at London Metropolitan Archives.

Leaders of the GLC

Timeline

See also

History of local government in London
 List of electoral divisions in Greater London
 List of Greater London Council committee chairs
 Members of the Greater London Council
 Greater London Council Staff Association
 Greater London Area War Risk Study
 OXO Tower – controversially sold by the GLC for £750,000 to Coin Street Community Builders in 1984
 GLC: The Carnage Continues... – satire of the GLC politics by The Comic Strip
 Gay Rights Working Party – part of the Greater London Council

References

 
1965 establishments in England
1986 disestablishments in England
Organizations established in 1965
Organizations disestablished in 1986
20th century in London
Defunct organisations based in London